Iconium is an unincorporated community in Appanoose County, Iowa, United States.

History
A post office was established in Iconium in 1853, and remained in operation until it was discontinued in 1903. The community is named after the ancient city of Konya (Latin: Iconium), in Turkey.

References

Unincorporated communities in Appanoose County, Iowa
1853 establishments in Iowa
Populated places established in 1853
Unincorporated communities in Iowa